Srednyaya Poltavka is a rural locality (a selo) in Srednepoltavsky Selsoviet of Konstantinovsky District, Amur Oblast, Russia. The population was 245 as of 2018. There are 4  streets.

Geography 
Srednyaya Poltavka is located 35 km northeast of Konstantinovka (the district's administrative centre) by road. Novotroitskoye is the nearest rural locality.

References 

Rural localities in Konstantinovsky District